William Clynt DD (died 17 February 1424) was an English medieval cathedral singer, college Fellow, and university Chancellor.

Clynt was a Fellow of Merton College, Oxford and Chancellor of the University of Oxford during 1408–09. He was Chantor (chief singer) at Lincoln Cathedral and was buried at Lincoln inside the cathedral.

References

Year of birth unknown
1424 deaths
People from Lincoln, England
English male singers
Fellows of Merton College, Oxford
Chancellors of the University of Oxford
14th-century English people
15th-century English people
15th-century singers
Medieval English singers